The Occident and American Jewish Advocate or simply The Occident (1843-1869), was the first general Jewish periodical published in the United States.  (The only earlier periodical, Solomon Henry Jackson's The Jew, was published as an anti-missionary journal).

Compiled by Rabbi Isaac Leeser from inception through 1868, in 1869 the publication was edited by Mayer Sulzberger.  (Sulzberger, a successful attorney was a disciple of Leeser's in his youth.  Leeser hoped Sulzberger would enter the rabbinate, but Sulzberger chose a career in law instead, but pledged to Leeser that he would edit the Occident for a year, which he fulfilled after Leeser's death.)

A monthly publication, the Occident did print weekly from April 1859 - March 1861 until returning to the monthly format. It contained a broad array of contents, including sermons, obituaries, juvenile literature, scholarly research, theology, spiritual poetry, domestic and foreign news of Jewish interest, resolutions adopted by congregations and organizations, book reviews and correspondence. The Occident is one of the most important records of American Jewish life in the middle decades of the 19th century.

Over ten years worth of this news monthly have been transcribed and are available for reading online.

References
 Goldman, Yosef, Hebrew Printing in America, YGBooks 2006.
 Jewish Encyclopedia entry for The Occident and American Jewish Advocate
 Kiron, Arthur. University of Pennsylvania The Mayer Sulzberger Collection Finding Aid(1994).

External links
 Searchable archives at Historical Jewish Press

1843 establishments in the United States
1869 disestablishments in the United States
Monthly magazines published in the United States
Weekly magazines published in the United States
Defunct magazines published in the United States
Jewish American literature
Jewish magazines published in the United States
Jewish printing and publishing
Magazines established in 1843
Magazines disestablished in 1869
Magazines published in Pennsylvania